The following is a list of spans, either used for overhead line crossings of rivers, sea straits or valleys, as antenna or for aerial tramways.

Powerline spans in flat areas with high pylons
At these spans the sag of the conductors is less than the height of the pylons

Powerline spans in mountainous areas requiring shorter pylons
At these spans, the pylons are situated on the tops of mountains, so the topography determines the height of the lines. Because of this it is possible that the span pylons can be lower than the height of the line at point of largest sag.

Antenna spans across valleys

Aerial tramways

Rope Tyroleans

Other

See also
 Architectural structure
 Timeline of three longest spans

References

Lists of construction records